This is an alphabetical list of notable illustrators.

A

B

C

D

E

F

G

H

I

J

K

L

M

N

O

P

R

S

T

U

V

W

Y
 Chao Yat

Z

See also
List of caricaturists
List of cartoonists
List of graphic designers
List of science fiction visual artists

References

 
Illustrators